Olavi is the seventh studio album by Finnish singer and songwriter Olavi Uusivirta, released on 12 February 2016. "Tanssit vaikka et osaa" was released as the first single on 15 January 2016. The album peaked at number one on the Finnish Albums Chart.

Track listing

Charts

Release history

See also
List of number-one albums of 2016 (Finland)

References

2016 albums
Olavi Uusivirta albums
Finnish-language albums